Destination: Infestation (in some markets released on DVD as Swarm or Deadly Swarm and online as Ants On A Plane) is a 2007 Canadian-American made for TV production in the disaster film genre, directed by George Mendeluk. It premiered in the US on the women-oriented Lifetime Movie Network.

Plot
A US passenger plane returning from Colombia to Miami is overrun by an infestation of mutated bullet ants, whose sting is the most painful of all insect stings and can be deadly. A government official refuses to allow an emergency landing, out of fear that the ants will enter the United States, so a female entomologist on board joins forces with the plane's rugged sky marshal in a desperate attempt to save the flight from disaster, while the ants are busy gnawing on electrical cables and various other fiber optics.

Cast

References

External links
 Official website for Destination: Infestation Retrieved 2011-07-03
 

2007 television films
2007 films
Canadian television films
English-language Canadian films
American aviation films
2007 action films
2000s English-language films
Films directed by George Mendeluk
2000s American films
2000s Canadian films